The Asian Team Chess Championship (recently also called the Asian Nations Chess Cup) is an international team chess tournament open to national federations affiliated to FIDE in Asia and Oceania. It is organized by the Asian Chess Federation, and the winner qualifies to participate at the next World Team Chess Championship. The open championship has been held at intervals of anywhere from one to four years since 1974. The Asian Women's Team Chess Championship has been held concurrently with the open championship since 1995.

The current Asian champion is Iran, which won in 2018 on home soil at Hamadan. Of the twenty editions of the open championship, China has won eight times, the Philippines have won six times, India has won three times, and Iran, Kazakhstan, and Uzbekistan have each won once. The defending champion of the women's tournament is China, which has won eight of the ten women's championships played; Vietnam won the other two.

Competition
Each member federation located in FIDE Zones 3.1 to 3.7 is entitled to enter a national team of four players and an optional reserve player into the open or women's tournament. The hosting nation is allowed to field two teams, and may field a third team if it results in an even number of participating teams. Currently, matches in both the open and women's tournament are contested on four ; the women's tournament had been contested on three boards from 1995 to 2008. Since 2008, the final standings in the tournament have been determined by the number of match points scored by each team; before 2008, scores were calculated based on board points. Various formats have been used for both the open and women's championships, with a round robin or Swiss-system tournament being the most common.

Summary of results

Open championship

Women's championship

Medal tables

Open championship

Women's championship

Other international team tournaments in Asia

Team chess events are currently part of the program of the Asian Indoor and Martial Arts Games, and have sometimes been part of the Southeast Asian Games, most recently in 2013. The 2006 and 2010 Asian Games also featured team chess events, as did the Pan Arab Games from 1999 to 2011.

An Asian Cities Chess Championship has been held roughly once every two years since 1979.

An Asian Nations Online Chess Cup was held in 2020 during the COVID-19 pandemic, which was won by Australia in the open section and India in the women's section.

See also

Chess Olympiad
Chess at the African Games
Pan American Team Chess Championship
European Team Chess Championship

References

Supranational chess championships
1974 in chess
Recurring sporting events established in 1974
1995 in chess
Recurring sporting events established in 1995
Chess in Asia
Chess_Championship
Chess in Oceania